Smoky is a 1966 American Western film, directed by George Sherman and starring Fess Parker, Diana Hyland, Katy Jurado and Hoyt Axton. The third of three film adaptations of the 1926 novel Smoky the Cowhorse by Will James, it utilizes the screenplay from the 1946 film.

It earned rentals in the US and Canada of $4 million.

Synopsis
A cowboy finds, captures, and patiently trains a black wild stallion. They develop a bond that is ultimately unbreakable. The cowboy's brother, however, needing money to pay off gambling debts signed in his brother's name, tries to trade the horse sneakily. While trying to sneak him out of his pen at night, the horse senses something is wrong and struggles against the brother and in the process accidentally kills him, before running off. The cowboy goes looking for him, fearing others will kill the horse over its reputation. Sadly he does not find him. The cowboy joins the Marines shortly after and the horse eventually is sold to perform on the rodeo circuit and then to a junk dealer. After the cowboy returns from military service, he sets out to find his beloved horse and the pair is soon reunited. A love story between the cowboy and the female ranch owner plays out under the radar.

Cast 
 Fess Parker as Clint Barkley  
 Diana Hyland as  Julie Richards
 Katy Jurado as Maria
 Hoyt Axton as Fred Denton 
 Robert J. Wilke as Jeff Nicks
 Armando Silvestre as Gordon
 Jorge Martínez de Hoyos as Pepe
 Chuck Roberson as Chuck  
 Ted White as Abbott
  Jose Hector Galindo  as Manuel  
 Roy Jenson as Ranchhand

Reception
According to Fox records, the film needed to earn $2,100,000 in rentals to break even and made $1,675,000, meaning it made a loss.

References

External links
 
 

1966 films
1966 Western (genre) films
20th Century Fox films
Remakes of American films
American Western (genre) films
1960s English-language films
Films about horses
Films based on children's books
Films based on Western (genre) novels
Films directed by George Sherman
Films scored by Leith Stevens
Films set in the 1940s
Films shot in Mexico
Films with screenplays by Dorothy Yost
1960s American films